Musician was a monthly magazine that covered news and information about American popular music. Initially called Music America, it was founded in 1976 by Sam Holdsworth and Gordon Baird. The two friends borrowed $20,000 from relatives and started the publication in a barn in Colorado.

Subtitled "The Art, Business and Technology of Making Music", it became known for its extended and thorough articles about the stars of rock music. Musician was not intended to be a fan magazine—the founders envisioned it as a publication about the musician's craft, and as a result, it earned it the respect of people in the music business. As Holdsworth told an interviewer in 2003, the magazine "created a level of trust that made the musicians feel they were talking with peers". In that same article, he said that Musician was also known for unearthing details that the average magazine did not—such as why a musician chose a particular brand of instrument, or what was the inspiration for a certain song.

Musician never gained a wide following, although it had a devoted readership. The magazine was respected by critics for the quality of its writers; among the best-known writers for Musician were rock critic Lester Bangs and soon-to-be film director Cameron Crowe. It was later renamed Musician, Player & Listener and was headquartered in Gloucester, Massachusetts.

Due to the expense of running it, Holdsworth and Baird sold it in January 1981 to the company that owned Billboard magazine. Holdsworth and another company executive bought it back in 1985, and they ran it until selling it again in 1987. The magazine folded in 1999.

References

Library of Congress: Musician. Gloucester, MA: Amordian Press, 1982–1999. ISSN 0733-5253.

Defunct magazines published in the United States
Magazines established in 1976
Magazines disestablished in 1999
Magazines published in Colorado
Magazines published in Massachusetts
Monthly magazines published in the United States
Music magazines published in the United States